Pere Valentí Mora Mariné (born 18 December 1947) is a Spanish retired footballer who played as a goalkeeper, and a coach.

He made 133 appearances in La Liga, mostly with Barcelona, and added a further 224 in Segunda División.

Playing career
Born in Vilaplana, Tarragona, Catalonia, Mora joined FC Barcelona's youth setup in 1965, aged 17. After appearing with the club's farm team, Atlètic Catalunya CF, and serving loans at CD Mestalla, Elche CF and Real Oviedo, he made his first-team debut on 17 February 1974, starting in a 5–0 routing of Real Madrid at the Santiago Bernabéu Stadium.

Mora was mainly used as a backup to Salvador Sadurní and Pedro María Artola during his spell at Barça, but still featured in the 1978 Copa del Rey Final. He also held a record of being 406 minutes without conceding in European competitions, which was subsequently broken by Víctor Valdés.

In the summer of 1979, Mora signed with fellow La Liga side Rayo Vallecano. He was an undisputed starter during his stint, appearing in no less than 34 matches per season but suffering relegation in his first.

In 1983, Mora joined Real Murcia in the top level. He retired three years later with the club in Segunda División, aged 38.

Managerial career
Mora took up coaching immediately after retiring, his first stop being at the TARR football academy. After two years at CF Igualada he returned to his former club Barcelona, being appointed as manager of the youth sides.

In 1993, Mora became the coach of Gimnàstic de Tarragona from Segunda División B. He continued to manage in that tier in the following years, with Murcia, Benidorm CF and CE Sabadell FC (two stints), also with a brief period in Tercera División with FC Cartagena.

Personal life
Mora's son, also known as Pere Mora, was also a footballer and a goalkeeper. He died on 20 September 2005, in a motorcycle accident in L'Hospitalet de Llobregat.

Honours
Barcelona
La Liga: 1973–74
Copa del Rey: 1970–71, 1977–78
UEFA Cup Winners' Cup: 1978–79

References

External links

1947 births
Living people
People from Baix Camp
Sportspeople from the Province of Tarragona
Spanish footballers
Footballers from Catalonia
Association football goalkeepers
La Liga players
Segunda División players
Tercera División players
FC Barcelona players
Valencia CF Mestalla footballers
Real Oviedo players
Elche CF players
Rayo Vallecano players
Real Murcia players
Spain youth international footballers
Spain under-23 international footballers
Spain amateur international footballers
Olympic footballers of Spain
Footballers at the 1968 Summer Olympics
Spanish football managers
Segunda División B managers
Gimnàstic de Tarragona managers
Real Murcia managers
FC Cartagena managers
CE Sabadell FC managers
Catalonia international footballers